Bellingen is a small town in the Mid North Coast of New South Wales, Australia. It is located on Waterfall Way on the Bellinger River, approximately halfway between the major Australian cities of Sydney and Brisbane. In 2021, the population of Bellingen was 13,253, and it is the council seat of Bellingen Shire.

History 
The Bellinger Valley was first settled by Kooris – the Gumbaynggir people. The first European to come across the Bellinger Valley was the stockman William Myles who arrived in 1840 looking for new valleys north of Kempsey and the Macleay River. The following year, Myles returned accompanied by government surveyor Clement Hodgkinson. Hodgkinson decided to name the area after the word that the Gumbaynggir people in the area used for the river, "Billingen", pronounced like "Billing-en". When it came time to write the word, the Aboriginal voice and the European ear combined to give the spelling of "Bellingen", and over time usage has altered the pronunciation to the current "Bell-in-jen".

At some point, a draughtsman who was compiling the Colony map from original documents misread Hodgkinson's final handwritten "n" as an "r"; meaning that the Bellingen River officially became, and is still the "Bellinger", while the town retained the name of "Bellingen".

Hodgkinson had spoken up about how the area contained a great deal of fine cedar and rosewood, and by 1842 there were cedar cutters at the mouth of the Bellinger River and sheep grazing in the valley. In July 1843 the first cargo of red cedar from the Bellinger Valley was transported to Sydney.

The growth of cedar cutting throughout the 1840s was dramatic, with 20 pit sawers operating along the river by 1843. By 1849, the first timber vessel, the 'Minerva', being built by a shipwright named William Darbyshire. So rich was the area in cedar that it was estimated that over 2 million feet of cedar were being extracted each year.

The Bellinger Valley was progressively settled throughout the 1850s. In 1864, a site was set apart and reserved for the village of Bellingen. In 1869, the Police Station and Court House were built in Bellingen, and the town allotments were surveyed in 1869 and were sold by public auction at West Kempsey Court House on 14 September 1870.

By the early 1900s, red cedar supplies in the Bellinger Valley were virtually depleted. The cleared areas were turned into prime farming land and the valley became a dairying centre. The indigenous population had been decimated by disease and inability to move across the land to locate traditional food supplies, and many were killed in their bid to drive away the cedar getters and new settlers from traditional Gumbaynggir land. 'Black Jimmy' was reported to be the last full-blood member of the Bellinger Gumbaynggir People. Black Jimmy died in 1922 and is buried in Bellingen Cemetery. The Gumbaynggir People still live in the area of Bellingen.

The dairy industry crashed in the 1960s with the rise of the European Common Market, when export prices fell (with Britain no longer relying on Australian dairy products) and the margarine industry finally overcame laws restricting its production levels. Dairy farming still continues to a lesser extent.

Rainforest logging ceased altogether in 1975. Sclerophyll forest logging is still carried out, but to a much lesser extent than in the past.

Heritage listings 
Bellingen has a number of heritage-listed sites, including:
 69-75 Hyde Street: Hammond and Wheatley Commercial Emporium

Population
According to the 2021 census of population, there were 13,253 people living in the town of Bellingen.
 79.4% of people were born in Australia. The next most common country of birth was England at 4.7%. 
 88.8% of people only spoke English at home. 
 The most common responses for religion were No Religion 50.8%, Anglican 14.1% and Catholic 11.7%.

According to the 2016 census of population, there were 3,074 people living in the town of Bellingen.
 78.8% of people were born in Australia. The next most common country of birth was England at 5.2%. 
 89.8% of people only spoke English at home. 
 The most common responses for religion were No Religion 46.9%, Catholic 13.1% and Anglican 12.5%.

Climate
Owing to high rainfall and its proximity to the valleys of the Bellinger and Kalang rivers, Bellingen is known for its frequent flooding. Tallowood Point near Bellingen often has the State's highest annual rainfall.

Culture
Bellingen was one of the filming locations for the 2003 comedy film Danny Deckchair, written and directed by Jeff Balsmeyer. Bellingen was also the notional setting of the book Oscar and Lucinda written by Booker Prize winning author Peter Carey. 
Bellingen was chosen as the location for filming an adaptation of Murray Bail's novel Eucalyptus and a set costing $6.4 million was constructed but, due to differences between director Jocelyn Moorhouse and actor Russell Crowe, filming never commenced.

Bellingen has a strong affinity with the arts and is home to numerous festivals: historically the popular Global Carnival (often known simply as " The Global"), the Bellingen Jazz and Blues Festival, and the current Camp Creative, the Bellingen Music Festival (classical music), Bello Winter Music Festival] and the  Bellingen Readers and Writers Festival, held for the first time in 2011. The first and original festival, an annual event, was the Azalea Festival, which included a procession of floats, the local brass band and pipeband, and various community organisations marching down Hyde Street to the cheers and applause of the spectators.

Bellingen also hosts the twice yearly Plant Fairs as a fundraiser for the Bellingen Environment Centre. These fairs attract thousands of visitors to the town and the 70+ stall-holders provide information and sell bushland-friendly Australian native, food-bearing and landscape plants and heirloom seeds, garden equipment, furniture and supplies to provide local food, and habitat for native birds and animals.

Schools
 Bellingen Public School
 St Mary's Primary School
 Chrysalis School for Rudolph Steiner Education
 Bellingen High School

Notable residents
 Saskia Burmeister – actress.
 Mike Cockerill – Australian Football journalist writing and presenting for Fairfax Newspapers and Fox Sports respectively.
 Bruce Cowan – politician.
 Ben Cropp – ocean adventurer, shipwreck hound, marine conservationist, and filmmaker.
 Keith Froome – Australian national Rugby League Test captain.
 Adam Gilchrist – Australian test cricketer/sportscaster.
 Jimmy Hannan –  Australian radio and television personality.
 David Helfgott – Australian concert pianist.
 Matthew Locke – Sergeant of the Special Air Service Regiment, and Medal for Gallantry recipient. He was slain while serving his country in Afghanistan.
 Oliver McGill – Australian musician who is the keyboard player and backing vocalist for The Cat Empire.
 George Negus –  Australian author, journalist, and television presenter, and host of Dateline.
 Gordon Parsons – country music singer-songwriter, best known as the composer of Slim Dusty's 1957 hit song A Pub With No Beer.
 Colin Thompson – author and illustrator.
 John Warwick – actor and dramatist.
 Ziggy Ramo - singer

References

External links

 Bellingen Online
 Bellingen Museum
 Bellingen – VisitNSW.com

Towns in New South Wales
Mid North Coast
Bellingen Shire